Garston is a small settlement in northern Southland, in the South Island of New Zealand, located close to the region's boundary with Otago. It is the most inland settlement in New Zealand. It is situated south of Lake Wakatipu and close to the upper reaches of the Mataura River, between Kingston and Lumsden.

Garston is notable for its trout fishing and ice skating. Local attractions include the Garston Pub and recently developed mountain biking track. The Around the Mountains Cycle Trail passes through the town.

References 

Populated places in Southland, New Zealand